This is a list of elections in Canada in 2013. Included are provincial, municipal and federal elections, by-elections on any level, referendums and party leadership races at any level.

January to April
January 26 - 2013 Ontario Liberal Party leadership election
March 9 - 2013 Saskatchewan New Democratic Party leadership election
March 17 - 2013 Quebec Liberal Party leadership election
April 14 - 2013 Liberal Party of Canada leadership election
April 15 - Provincial by-election in Kent, New Brunswick

May to August
May 5 - Québec solidaire co-spokesperson election
May 13 - Federal by-election in Labrador
May 14 - 2013 British Columbia general election
June 25 - Provincial by-election in Cartwright-L'Anse au Clair, Newfoundland and Labrador
July 10 - Provincial by-election in Westside-Kelowna, British Columbia
August 1 - Provincial by-elections in Etobicoke—Lakeshore, London West, Ottawa South, Scarborough—Guildwood and Windsor—Tecumseh, Ontario

September to December
September 24 - 2013 Newfoundland and Labrador municipal elections
October 8 - 2013 Nova Scotia general election
October 21 - 2013 Alberta municipal elections
October 26 - 2013 Manitoba Liberal Party leadership election
October 28 - 2013 Nunavut general election
October 28 - municipal by-elections and plebiscites in New Brunswick 
November 3 - 2013 Quebec municipal elections
November 6 - Saskatchewan municipal elections, 2013 (even-numbered rural municipalities)
November 15–17 - 2013 Liberal Party of Newfoundland and Labrador leadership election
November 25 - Federal by-election in Bourassa, Brandon—Souris, Provencher, and Toronto Centre
November 26 - Provincial by-election in Carbonear-Harbour Grace, Newfoundland and Labrador 
December 2 - Nunavut municipal elections, 2013 (hamlets)
December 2 - Municipal plebiscites in New Brunswick 
December 9 - Provincial by-election in Outremont and Viau, Quebec
December 9 - Municipal by-election in Windsor, Ontario for city council Ward 7.

References

See also
Municipal elections in Canada
Elections in Canada

 
Political timelines of the 2010s by year